Laura Farina is a Canadian poet.

Life
She grew up in Ottawa and attended Canterbury High School.

Awards
 2006 Archibald Lampman Award for This Woman Alphabetical

Works
 
"Twelve Lines for Spring"; "Fish", This Magazine, May-June 2008

Anthologies

Editor

Reviews
Laura Farina's debut collection, This Woman Alphabetical, is at the forefront of this neo-Modernist sensibility. The biggest strengths of Farina's book are the predominant imagist and surrealist impulses in her poems. ...it is a surprising, if not controversial, choice—probably good for poetry in Canada, and definitely good for Farina.

References

Year of birth missing (living people)
Living people
21st-century Canadian poets
Canadian women poets
Writers from Ottawa
21st-century Canadian women writers